Mar Kuriakose College, is an arts and science College in Kerala, India situated in Puthuvely 5 kilometers south of Koothattukulam and 32 kilometers north of Kottayam. The college was established in 2010. It is affiliated to the Mahatma Gandhi University in Kottayam and is approved by the Government of Kerala.

References

External links
 http://www.markuriakosecollege.com

Arts and Science colleges in Kerala
Colleges affiliated to Mahatma Gandhi University, Kerala
Universities and colleges in Kottayam district
Educational institutions established in 2010
2010 establishments in Kerala